Church Hill Farm is a historic home and farm complex located at Peters Township in Franklin County, Pennsylvania. The house is a three-part, two-story stone-and-frame dwelling.  It has 2 three-bay stone sections dated to the 1820s or 1830s, with a two-story, frame addition dated between 1840 and 1900.  Also on the property are a contributing barn, out kitchen, corn crib, and wagon shed.

It was listed on the National Register of Historic Places in 1980.

References 

Farms on the National Register of Historic Places in Pennsylvania
Houses on the National Register of Historic Places in Pennsylvania
Houses in Franklin County, Pennsylvania
National Register of Historic Places in Franklin County, Pennsylvania